Frederick Samson Robert Morice Fox (born 5 April 1989) is an English film and stage actor. His prominent screen performances include roles as singer Marilyn in the BBC's Boy George biopic Worried About the Boy (2010), Freddie Baxter in series Cucumber (2015) and Banana (2015), and Jeremy Bamber in White House Farm (2020).

His many notable theatre credits include starring as Simon Bliss in Hay Fever (2012) at the Noël Coward Theatre; as Oscar Wilde's young lover Lord Alfred "Bosie" Douglas in The Judas Kiss (2012–2013) at the Hampstead Theatre, during a UK tour, and in a West End transfer; as Romeo in Romeo and Juliet (2015) at the Sheffield Crucible and in Kenneth Branagh's 2016 production at the Garrick Theatre; as Tristan Tzara in Travesties (2016–2017) at the Menier Chocolate Factory and Apollo Theatre; as Lord Goring in An Ideal Husband (2018) at the Vaudeville Theatre; and as Edmond Rostand in Edmond de Bergerac (2019) at the Birmingham Repertory Theatre and during a UK tour.

Fox appeared on the big screen in The Three Musketeers (2011), The Riot Club (2014), Pride (2014), Victor Frankenstein (2015), King Arthur: Legend of the Sword (2017) and Black '47 (2018).

Early life and education

Frederick Samson Robert Morice Fox was born on 5 April 1989 in Hammersmith, London. He was raised between London and the family home in Kimmeridge Bay, Dorset and was surrounded by actors and writers from a young age.

He is the son of actress Joanna David (née Joanna Elizabeth Hacking) and actor Edward Fox. He is the younger brother of actress Emilia Fox and the half-brother of Lucy Arabella Preston (the Viscountess Gormanston), the grandson of actress Angela Worthington Fox and theatrical agent Robin Fox, and the great-grandson of the playwright Frederick Lonsdale. He is the nephew of producer Robert Fox and actor James Fox, and a cousin to actors Laurence, Jack and Lydia Fox. He was named after Fred Zinnemann, who directed his father in The Day of the Jackal, and after his great-great grandfather Victorian industrialist Samson Fox, who invented the corrugated boiler flue and built Harrogate's former Kursaal now known as the Royal Hall. Asked if he believes in his acting gene, he said, "I used not to until my sister Milly was on the BBC's Who Do You Think You Are?" where they discovered the thespian thread goes back 100 years.

From 1994 to 2002, Fox was educated at Arnold House School, a preparatory school for boys in the St John's Wood area of London, where he was head boy. He was prefect during secondary school at Bryanston School, a boarding school in Dorset where he perfected his elocution and overcame fairly serious dyslexia. During his time there, he portrayed a headmaster in A Risky Business, a play written especially for him by a classics master.

He then attended the Guildhall School of Music and Drama in London and graduated in 2010. His drama teachers praised his talent for acting.

Career

Beginnings
Fox's first screen appearance was at age seven as an extra in the 1997 TV adaptation of Rebecca. In 2009, he appeared in St Trinian's 2: The Legend of Fritton's Gold as head boy and in Agatha Christie's Marple as Tom Savage. In 2010, he starred as Jamie in the musical The Last Five Years at the Silk Street Theatre and, after a sell-out success, at the Barbican Pit Theatre.

2010–2015: Worried About the Boy, Cucumber, Banana
Fox starred in his first breakthrough role as the androgynous 1980s pop star Marilyn in Worried About The Boy based on the life of English singer Boy George. He appeared as Peter Scabius in Any Human Heart and as Guy Wells in Rosamunde Pilcher's Shades of Love. He played cleft-palated Camille Chandebise in A Flea in Her Ear at The Old Vic, Tony Davenport in the stage play revival of Cause Célèbre at The Old Vic, and Ratallack in The Shadow Line.

His international film debut came through his role as King Louis XIII of France in The Three Musketeers (2011). In 2012, he played the title role in The Mystery of Edwin Drood. He appeared in Lewis as Sebastian Dromgoole and in Tom Stoppard's critically acclaimed period drama Parade's End as Edward Wannop. He then played Simon Bliss in Hay Fever at the Noël Coward Theatre and made an early career impact as Oscar Wilde's young lover Lord Alfred "Bosie" Douglas in The Judas Kiss (2012–2013) at the Hampstead Theatre, during a UK tour, and in its West End transfer. Fox voiced Prince Louis of Battenberg in Margy Kinmonth's Royal Paintbox with HRH The Prince of Wales featuring the artworks of the British royal family across centuries. He also starred as Sandy Irvine in Words of Everest.

In Lone Scherfig's The Riot Club (2014) Fox played James Leighton-Masters, the outgoing president of the ten-member elite Oxford University club. Based on Laura Wade's hit play Posh, it tackles class and social structure as a commentary on the Bullingdon Club. He appeared as Jeff Cole in the critically acclaimed historical comedy-drama Pride and starred in Anthony Fabian's Freeze-Frame (2014) commissioned by the Foreign and Commonwealth Office to promote collaboration between China and UK's film industries.

In 2015, he played the breakout 'bisexual nympho' Freddie Baxter in the Channel 4 hit series Cucumber, a role which he reprised in E4's Banana, and appeared as himself in Tofu. Both Cucumber and Banana were nominated for the GLAAD Media Award for Outstanding TV Movie or Limited Series in 2016. i-D said of Fox, "you can't deny he's a connoisseur at picking the parts which have maximum impact." Fox then played the wealthy aristocrat Finnegan, the benefactor of the title character's Prometheus creation in Victor Frankenstein.

2015–2017: Romeo and Juliet, Travesties, Dennis and Gnasher: Unleashed! 

In June 2016, he was announced as third prize winner at the 2015 Ian Charleson Awards, having played the role of Romeo in Romeo and Juliet (2015) to great acclaim at the Sheffield Crucible. His proficiency with the role led him to be called into service again as Romeo in Kenneth Branagh's 2016 production at the Garrick Theatre on short notice when the preceding Romeo and his understudy were both injured. With just a 2-day rehearsal after he was cast, Fox took over the role on 26 July and performed it until the end of the play's run on 13 August, garnering rave reviews and impressing cast and crew. He then starred in The Northleach Horror as the maverick scientist Whitsuntide and led the cast of A Midsummer Night's Dream at Southwark Playhouse as Nick Bottom / Demetrius.

He performed as poet Tristan Tzara, one of the founders and central figures of the Dada movement, in Tom Stoppard's Travesties from September until November 2016 at the Menier Chocolate Factory, the play being listed in The Arts Desk's Best of 2016: Theatre. The following year, it ran for a West End revival from February to April 2017 at the Apollo Theatre to widespread acclaim, subsequently earning Fox nominations at the Laurence Olivier Awards for Best Actor in a Supporting Role and the WhatsOnStage Awards for Best Supporting Actor in a Play.

He then voiced Dennis in hit computer-animated series Dennis & Gnasher: Unleashed!, in its launch becoming the highest-rated animated show on CBBC for 6 to 12 year olds and one of the top 10 shows for kids across all channels. Its first season received nominations at the 2018 British Animation Awards as Best Children's Series, the 2019 Kidscreen Awards as Best Animated Series, and the 2018 International Emmy Kids Awards in the Animation category. He then appeared as Rubio in King Arthur: Legend of the Sword (2017) directed by Guy Ritchie. Fox played key scenes as Mr. Sloane in Joe Orton Laid Bare, voiced a character/s in Lego Marvel Super Heroes 2, and voiced Corvin in Xenoblade Chronicles 2.

2018–2019: The Ice King, An Ideal Husband, Hero, Edmond de Bergerac
In February 2018, Fox starred as the British Commander Pope in Black '47, Ireland's first historical film on the Great Famine of 1847. Released in the same month at the CPH:DOX to great acclaim was James Erskine's The Ice King narrated by Fox which profiles the life of John Curry who revolutionised ice skating from a dated sport into an exalted art form and became the first openly gay Olympian when homosexuality was still illegal. Little White Lies remarks, "Fox affects Curry's distinctive accent with remarkable accuracy." In An Ideal Husband, which ran from May to July 2018 at the Vaudeville Theatre to critical acclaim, Freddie starred with his father Edward for the first time playing fictional father and son the Earl of Caversham and Lord Goring. According to Financial Times, Freddie "effortlessly delivers that mix of insouciance and gravity" and, for The Telegraph,"embodies the Wildean spirit of modernity".

In the same year was his directorial debut through the short film Hero (2018), which he co-wrote and co-produced, centred on an isolated young boy and a decaying old film star brought together by their shared love of the silver screen. It premiered in August at the Rhode Island International Film Festival where he won the Grand Prize (Short) for Directorial Discovery Award. It was subsequently selected at the Kerry Film Festival and the Linea d'Ombra Film Festival, and released on Amazon UK and ITunes in multiple countries in November 2019.

In 2019, he headlined the English production of Edmond de Bergerac playing the titular role playwright Edmond Rostand at the Birmingham Repertory Theatre before touring the UK to great acclaim. The Guardian raved that as Edmond, Fox is "by turns a jangle of nerves, a lead weight of despondency and a blaze of success." Fox then voiced Captain Holly in Watership Down and played the characters Jokannen, Dorian Gray, and Lord Goring in The Importance of Being Oscar. He starred as Detective Sargeant Wilbur Strauss in the highly rated Victorian comedy Year of the Rabbit, which he described as his "first real comedy show" and "a total lesson in improvised and situational comedy" that he had never had before. He also rendered dramatic performances in "The Class Ceiling" episode of Novels That Shaped Our World. Thomas Clay's Fanny Lye Deliver'd then premiered to positive reviews as a new cult classic set in 1657 Shropshire where Fox played Thomas Ashbury. The Independent said that he "gives Thomas a flash of predatory charisma,"  and according to The Irish News, "preaches 'perfect libertinism' in captivating sermons".

2020–present: White House Farm 
At the start of 2020, Fox delivered a persuasive performance in his role as the convicted mass murderer Jeremy Bamber in the ITV crime drama White House Farm based on the White House Farm murders in August 1985. In preparation, he created a psychology as convincing and enigmatic as the character should be "to leave the viewer asking questions". The London Evening Standard praised Fox's "ambiguous, wide-eyed look that hovers between angelic and devious, that it's hard to know whether to feel sympathy or suspicion." The Times remarked that he managed to be both "revealing and inscrutable, which can't be easy." The series won as Best New Drama at the 2020 TV Choice Awards leading to its international release on HBO Max in September 2020 and on Netflix in February 2021. Subsequently, he appeared on his co-star Cressida Bonas' podcast Fear Itself, where he expressed his fear of not reaching his full potential.

In the same year, Fox guest-starred as the alcoholic busker Miles Stevens in McDonald & Dodds and as King Hugo of Sweden in Hulu's critically acclaimed comedy-drama series The Great (2020). He reprised his voice-over role as Dennis in the second season of Dennis & Gnasher: Unleashed! from which select episodes were condensed into the film Dennis and Gnasher: Unleashed! On the Big Screen. He then portrayed Margaret Thatcher's son Mark Thatcher in season 4 of the award-winning Netflix historical drama series The Crown (2020).

In 2021, Fox opened The Golden Era of Broadway episode of The Theatre Channel, singing an arrangement of "Willkommen" and "Money" from Cabaret, and starred as Tony Kroesig, a Bullingdon club member and aristocrat banker turned politician, in The Pursuit of Love.

Philanthropy
Fox is a patron of the St Giles Trust and Future 5 — a campaign by Prostate Cancer Research Centre. He is also an honorary vice president of the Story of Christmas Appeal. In March 2015, he became the face of Live Below The Line. An avid runner himself, he supported the St James's Place Foundation Triathlon and Duathlon in 2016 which raised £1.3m for Hope and Homes for Children. He was involved with the charity when he visited orphanages in Rwanda in 2015 and in Uganda in 2018 which he wrote about in a two-part blog entry, "Love is Everything—Freddie Fox in Uganda". He is a frequent supporter and reader at fundraising activities and charity events of The Poetry Hour, Breast Cancer Now, the Brain Tumour Research Campaign, The Story of Christmas Appeal, and The National Brain Appeal among others. In 2020, he participated in a charity read of Tom Stoppard's The Real Inspector Hound produced by Lockdown Theatre in association with The Royal Theatrical Fund. In 2021, he performed with Alfie Boe on a global livestream concert, Alfie Boe & Friends Live At The Savoy "Lockdown Edition",  which sold tickets to donate to Hospitality Action and the Connection at St. Martin's.

Public image
Fox is described by The Guardian as "deliciously debonair" and "at age 23, is all responsive intelligence and poised charm and is unguarded – as people happy in their own skins often are." "He is almost tyrannically polite and charming," says The Telegraph, and, "raised in a pack of upper-class thespians, his every utterance comes as a measured, um-less paragraph." Often branded as an acting royalty, he comes from a family whose decades-long performances formed a dynasty which he now fronts as the latest scion. Amidst inevitable assumptions, he clarifies that though his parents' ties may have opened doors to agents, it is "not a masonic back door to every job".

Another Magazine remarked that at the age of 23, Fox "has surprisingly well-formed opinions on men's style." According to The Gentleman's Journal, whose cover he headlined on their Autumn 2014 issue, Fox "continues to impress commentators with his suave, dandy-esque style." He was featured in The Chaps Summer 2018 edition in what the magazine boasts of as their best edition, saying that "no previous issue has so comprehensively gathered so many vital strands of 'anarcho-dandyism'". Fox launched the opening of White Shirt Week in St James's, London in 2013. His commentary on the role his costume played in The Riot Club was featured on Financial Times.

Averse to social media, he said that he keeps a boundary while talking about things he is interested in to preserve his mystery as an actor "so that there's still an element of surprise about where characters come from."

Personal life

Fox dated Tamzin Merchant, his co-star in The Mystery of Edwin Drood, for two years until September 2013. In June 2020, it was reported that he was dating Sex Education star Tanya Reynolds, whom he met in 2016 during production of Fanny Lye Deliver'd. While promoting Cucumber in 2015, Fox stated that he hopes to "fall in love with another person, as opposed to a sex" and expounded further in 2020 saying that "being able to say that you have a more rounded experience as a human being, whether it be through sexuality, or whatever, is now perceived as a real advantage".

Outside of acting, Fox enjoys "swimming, taking photographs, walking in the countryside, writing poems and screenplays", fishing and shooting, and doing charity work. He plays the guitar and used to play the cello. The Secret History, Brideshead Revisited, and Marcus Aurelius' Meditations are some of his favourite books.

Filmography

Film

Television

Theatre

Web

Directed film

Concert performance

Video games

Radio and audio
Since 2010, Freddie Fox has voiced characters in numerous radio productions of the BBC.

Awards and nominations

References

External links

 

1989 births
Living people
21st-century English male actors
English male film actors
English male stage actors
English male television actors
People educated at Arnold House School
People educated at Bryanston School
People from Hammersmith
Robin Fox family
English male voice actors
English radio actors
Audiobook narrators
English Shakespearean actors
Male actors from London
English video game actors
English film directors
English film producers
Alumni of the Guildhall School of Music and Drama
Actors from Dorset
English web series actors
Ian Charleson Award winners
21st-century British male actors